VLP may refer to:

Virus-like particle, resemble viruses, but are non-infectious because they do not contain any viral genetic material
Value Line Publishing, a financial publishing firm based in New York
Vanuatu Labour Party, a political party in Vanuatu
Victorian Liberal Party, an Australian political party from 1954–55VIP

Video Long Play, an original name of the LaserDisc format
Vila Rica Municipal Airport (IATA code: VLP), in Vila Rica, Mato Grosso, Brazil
Volunteer Lawyers Project, a Boston Bar Association project, provides pro bono civil legal assistance to low-income clients
VLP TV, a regional Chilean TV channel
Vive La Peinture, a French urban art group, see Figuration Libre